Clarified butter is milk fat rendered from butter to separate the milk solids and water from the butterfat. Typically, it is produced by melting butter and allowing the components to separate by density. The water evaporates, some solids (i.e. whey proteins) float to the surface and are skimmed off, and the remainder of the milk solids (casein) sink to the bottom and are left behind when the butterfat (which would then be on top) is poured off or separated with a separatory funnel or a gravy fat separator. This butterfat is the clarified butter.

Commercial methods of production also include direct evaporation, but may also be accomplished by decantation and centrifugation followed by vacuum drying; or direct from cream by breaking the emulsion followed by centrifugation.

Properties
Clarified butter has a higher smoke point than regular butter, and is therefore preferred in some cooking applications, such as sautéing. Clarified butter also has a much longer shelf life than fresh butter. It has negligible amounts of lactose and casein and is, therefore, acceptable to most who have a lactose intolerance or casein allergy.

Regional variations
In cuisine of the Indian subcontinent, ghee is made by cooking clarified butter longer during the separation process in order to caramelize the milk solids, resulting in a nutty flavor when they are filtered out.

In Yemen, there is a local custom where hot water is added to butter while the milk or whey is still within the butter. This mixture is then placed into a separate vessel where it is brought to a boil. Wheat flour or roasted and ground fenugreek seeds is mixed with roasted wheat kernels, and cooked with the butter on low heat – allowed to simmer. Afterwards, the butter is strained until a clear batch of liquid clarified butter remains. It may be stored in an earthenware container in a cool place, or in a smoked container to impart its flavor.

In Mongolia, ghee or "yellow oil" is widely consumed with traditional milk tea.

See also
 Manteiga-da-terra, a Brazilian clarified butter product
 Niter kibbeh, a seasoned, clarified butter used in Ethiopian cuisine
 Smen, a salted, fermented clarified butter, widely used in North African and Middle Eastern cuisines
 Schmaltz, clarified animal fat
 Dairy product

References
 

Butter
Cooking fats
Sauces
Indian dairy products